The 1951 Syracuse Orangemen football team represented Syracuse University in the 1951 college football season. The Orangemen were led by third-year head coach Ben Schwartzwalder and played their home games at Archbold Stadium in Syracuse, New York. Syracuse finished the season with a 5–4 record and were not invited to a bowl game.

Schedule

References

Syracuse
Syracuse Orange football seasons
Syracuse Orangemen football